Sexuality and religion may refer to:
 Religion and sexuality
 Homosexuality and religion

See also
Sex and religion (disambiguation)